Robert Martens (born 4 November 1899, date of death unknown) was a French racing cyclist. He rode in the 1921 Tour de France.

References

1899 births
Year of death missing
French male cyclists
Place of birth missing